Paul Lincoln Adams (April 9, 1908 – November 23, 1990) was an American lawyer, politician, and judge from Michigan. He served as a mayor of Sault Ste. Marie, as a member of the University of Michigan Board of Regents, as Michigan Attorney General, and as a justice of the Michigan Supreme Court.

Early life and education
Adams was born in Sault Ste. Marie, Michigan, on April 9, 1908. His family had been farmers in the area since 1897, but by the early 1900s had shifted to insurance and real estate. Adams graduated Sault High School in 1926.  He received his B.A. in 1930 and M.A. in 1931 from the University of Michigan.

Adams returned to his family business for three years, then entered the University of Michigan Law School.  He earned his LL.B. in 1936 and was admitted to the bar the same year.  While in law school, he became friends with G. Mennen Williams and others who became prominent in Michigan politics. Also while in law school, Adams married Ruth Karpinski, daughter of the University of Michigan mathematician Louis Charles Karpinski.

Career
Adams returned to Sault Ste. Marie, where he practiced law and served in various civic roles.  He was mayor from 1938 to 1942. From 1941 to 1943, during World War II, he served as director of civil defense in Sault Ste. Marie.  From 1943-1944, Adams served with the Board of Economic Warfare in Washington, D.C.; he then returned to Sault Ste. Marie.  In 1949, Adams served as a member of the Michigan Social Welfare Commission. In 1950, he served as chair of the Sault Ste. Marie Charter Commission.

In 1956, Adams was elected a member of the University of Michigan Board of Regents. He served until the following year, when Governor G. Mennen Williams appointed to fill an unexpired term as Michigan Attorney General. Adams was elected twice as attorney general in his own right (in 1958 and 1960). He left the position after Governor John Swainson appointed Adams in December 1961 to serve on the Michigan Supreme Court. Adams left the court later that year but returned in 1964 and served on the court until his retirement in 1973.  Thereafter, he spent his time in Clinton County, Michigan, where he had orchards. Adams died on November 23, 1990.  He was survived by his wife Ruth and four daughters.

Adams' papers are archived at the Bentley Historical Library at the University of Michigan.

Notes

1908 births
1990 deaths
Mayors of places in Michigan
Michigan Attorneys General
Justices of the Michigan Supreme Court
People from Sault Ste. Marie, Michigan
Regents of the University of Michigan
University of Michigan Law School alumni
20th-century American judges
20th-century American lawyers
20th-century American politicians
20th-century American academics